General elections were held in Kuwait on 4 July 1999. A total of 288 candidates contested the election, which saw pro-government candidates and secular opposition candidates emerge as the two largest blocs in Parliament. Voter turnout was 83%.

Results

Aftermath
Jassem Al-Kharafi unseated Ahmed Al-Sadoun as Speaker after the election.

References

Kuwait
Election
Elections in Kuwait
Non-partisan elections